Lake Brâncoveanu (Romanian: Lacul Brâncoveanu)  is a natural salt lake in the town of Ocna Sibiului, Sibiu County, Transylvania, Romania. It is one of the many lakes of the Ocna Sibiului mine, a large salt mine which has one of the largest salt reserves in Romania. The lake has the biggest salinity out of every lake in the mine and is one of Romania's most salty lakes.

Name 
The lake is named after Constantin Brâncoveanu, a ruler of Wallachia.

History 
Lake Brâncoveanu is situated on the site of a salt mine that was in operation until 1699, when water infiltration caused it to be abandoned. In 1966, the water level of the lake had a sharp decrease of 11 m, because of the leakage of water through a crack produced in the salt wall in the underground lake adjacent to the Ignatius mine.

Information 
Surface: 
Maximum Depth: 
Salinity: 310 g/L (highest in the salt mine)

Lakes of the salt mine 
 Auster 
 Lake Avram Iancu-Ocniţa
 Balta cu Nămol 
 Brâncoveanu 
 Cloşca 
 Crişan
 Lacul Fără Fund 
 Gura Minei 
 Horea 
 Mâţelor 
 Negru
 Pânzelor 
 Rândunica 
 Verde (Freshwater lake)
 Vrăjitoarelor (Freshwater lake)

References 

Lakes of Sibiu County